Michael John Rupert (born October 23, 1951, Denver, Colorado) is an American actor, singer, director and composer. In 1968 he made his Broadway debut in The Happy Time as Bibi Bonnard for which he received a Tony Award nomination and the Theater World Award. He originated the role of "Marvin" in the William Finn musicals March of the Falsettos and Falsettoland. Rupert has been the nominee and recipient of several Tony and Drama Desk awards.

Early life
At 16 years old, Rupert made his Broadway debut in 1968 in Kander and Ebb's The Happy Time as the young Bibi Bonnard. His performance earned him the 1968 Theater World Award and his first Tony Award nomination for Featured Actor in a Musical. At the 22nd Tony Awards, Rupert performed "The Happy Time" and "A Certain Girl" from The Happy Time alongside his castmates Robert Goulet and David Wayne. He returned to California after The Happy Time, and appeared in local theater while in high school. During this time he appeared in the Disney film The Computer Wore Tennis Shoes and as Gery in the 1975 film adaptation of A Boy and His Dog.

Career

Acting 
Rupert returned to Broadway in 1974 as a replacement in the role of Pippin.
Holden, Stephen.  "A Musical With A Bundle of Letters In Leading Roles". The New York Times, April 10, 1988 In 1981, he appeared on Broadway in Shakespeare's Cabaret. He then originated the role of Marvin in two William Finn musicals, March of the Falsettos (1981) at the Off-Broadway Playwrights Horizons and Falsettoland (1990), which initiated at Playwrights Horizons before moving to the Lucille Lortel Theater. When March of the Falsettos and Falsettoland were performed together under the name Falsettos in 1992, Rupert once again played the role of Marvin, for which he received a nomination for the 1992 Tony Award for Best Actor in a Musical. In 1986 he appeared as Oscar in the Broadway revival of Sweet Charity, for which he won the 1986 Tony Award for Best Performance by a Featured Actor in a Musical. In the 1988 musical Mail, Rupert not only originated the role of Alex, but composed the music as well.Rich, Frank. "Review/Theater;Epistles Set to Music, In Colker-Rupert 'Mail' ", The New York Times, April 15, 1988, Section C; p.3 He was a replacement in the role of Stine in City of Angels in 1989 and was in Ragtime as a replacement Tateh in 1999. 

In 2003, he performed with Betty Buckley, Christian Borle, Carolee Carmello and Keith Bryon Kirk in the Lincoln Center staging of William Finn's Elegies: A Song Cycle. He originated the role of Professor Callahan in Legally Blonde (2007) on Broadway and returned to the role on the National tour, starting in February 2010."Michael Rupert Returns to 'Legally Blonde' on Tour Broadwayworld.com, February 10, 2010  Rupert appeared as Kenneth Sharpe in the play 7th Monarch Off-Broadway at the Acorn Theater, opening in June 2012.(author unknown). ‘7th Monarch,’ by Jim Henry, at the Acorn Theater".  The New York Times, June 25, 2012 He appeared in the Broadway revival of On the Town as Judge Pitkin, which ran from October 2014 to September 2015.

In regional theatre, he starred as Norbert in a workshop production of The Happy Elf, composed by Harry Connick, Jr. at Montgomery College's Robert E. Parilla Performing Arts Center, Rockville, Maryland in a co-production with Adventure Theatre, Washington, DC in November 2010.

His television credits include guest roles on series such as My Three Sons, The Waltons, Marcus Welby, M.D. and its legal spin-off  Owen Marshall: Counselor at Law, Another World,  Emergency!, Cannon, Alice, The Partridge Family, Alias Smith and Jones, Hawkins, Cheers, Law & Order and New York Undercover. He was in the MTV broadcast of Legally Blonde in 2007.

 Directing 
In 1997, Rupert directed an Off-Broadway production of he The Lunch Anxieties by Larry Kunofsky at the Harold Clurman Theatre. He directed J. Arlington Meyrelles III's musical, The Stars In Your Eyes, in an Equity workshop production in 1998. Rupert directed Thrill Me: Leopold & Loeb Story (2005) at the York Theatre. 

 Composing 
Rupert composed the music, with book and lyrics by Jerry Colker, to the 1985 Off-Broadway music 3 Guys Naked from the Waist Down, which won the Drama Desk Award for Outstanding Book and was nominated for Outstanding Music.  The score for Mail (1988) was also written by Rupert with Colker once again writing the book and lyrics. Rupert wrote the score to Strange Vacation (1998) and collaborated with Allan Heinberg. He composed the score and co-wrote the book and lyrics with Matthew Riopelle for the musical Streets of America'' (2007). On August 18, 2008 the number "Racing to the Moon" was released Footlight Label as a single featuring three different performances: one by Rupert, another by actor Sebastian Arcelus, and an instrumental version by the guitarist David Timmons. His debut single, "Racing to the Moon" was released on August 18, 2008 on the Footlight label.

Personal life 
Rupert lives in New York City with his life partner, Will Chafin.

Theater Credits

Awards and Nominations

Notes

References

External links
 
 
 
 Michael Rupert on Myspace

1951 births
Living people
American male musical theatre actors
Drama Desk Award winners
American gay actors
Theatre World Award winners
Tony Award winners
LGBT people from Colorado